Pétur Jóhann Sigfússon (born 21 April 1972) is an Icelandic actor, comedian, radio host and screenwriter. He was named the Funniest Man in Iceland in 1999. He is known for his portrayal of Ólafur Ragnar in the television series Næturvaktin and its sequels, Dagvaktin and Fangavaktin.

Early life
Pétur was born in Sauðárkrókur but moved at a young age to Reykjavík.

References

External links

Living people
1972 births
Petur Johann Sigfusson
Petur Johann Sigfusson
Petur Johann Sigfusson
Petur Johann Sigfusson
Petur Johann Sigfusson
Petur Johann Sigfusson